is the debut single by Japanese singer Keiko Masuda. Written by Miyuki Nakajima, the single was released on November 28, 1981, eight months after the disbandment of Masuda's group Pink Lady. It peaked at No. 9 on Oricon's singles charts and sold 267,000 copies.

Masuda was inspired to collaborate with Nakajima after listening to Junko Sakurada's 1977 song , which was written by Nakajima. "Suzume" marked a musical change for Masuda from Pink Lady's bubblegum disco pop style to a more contemporary kayōkyoku sound that would define her solo career.

In 1985, Nakajima recorded her version of the song in her self-cover album Oiro Naoshi. She also recorded another version of the song in her 2014 cover album .

Track listing (7" vinyl)
All tracks arranged by Nozomi Aoki.

Chart position

Cover versions 
Yōko Hatanaka covered the song in her 1982 album Kyōkō Toppa.

References

External links 
 

1981 debut singles
1981 songs
Japanese-language songs
Miyuki Nakajima songs
Songs written by Miyuki Nakajima
Warner Music Japan singles